The Anglian Combination (known as the Hadley & Ottaway Anglian Combination under the terms of a sponsorship deal) is an English football league that operates in the East Anglia area. The league specifically covers Norfolk and northern Suffolk with rules stating that clubs should be within a 50 miles radius from the centre of Norwich.

It consists of 104 teams and has seven divisions – the Premier Division, Division One to Four plus the two regionalised divisions, Division Five North and South. Its top division is currently at step 7 (or level 11) of the National League System. A U19 Development Division was proposed to start in the 2014–15 season depending on interest.

Each season, the best of the Anglian Combination's footballers are selected to represent the Anglian Combination in the FA Inter-League Cup, a cup competition for the FA's regional leagues.

CNSOBU (City of Norwich School Old Boys Union) were the first champions of the Anglian Combination in 1965, winning the Senior A Division in the league's transitional season. Blofield United is the most successful club in the Anglian Combination's history with six top division league titles while Acle United and Wroxham have won the most consecutive titles with both clubs winning the Anglian Combination four times in succession.

Sheringham are the reigning champions after winning the 2018–19 Premier Division.

History

The league was formed in 1964, as a merger of the East Anglian League and the Norfolk & Suffolk League (established 1897) and had a transitional season in 1964–65 before settling down to a regular format for the 1965–66 season of four divisions for first teams and three for reserves. A further division for first teams was added for 1966–67, and that format remained unchanged until the previously separate reserve divisions incorporated into the main structure for the 2003–04 season. The winners of the Premier Division are also known as the Sterry Cup winners and are eligible for promotion to the Eastern Counties League.

After a league meeting of the Anglian Combination clubs on 9 February 2011, it was decided the Anglian Combination would adopt the FA's Respect programme. This included the practice of all players on the two teams and match officials shaking hands before the game.

On 25 June 2012, a proposed trial for rolling substitutions was rejected by Anglian Combination clubs at a league AGM.

To try and solve problems with decreasing youth participation, a U19 Development Division was agreed on at a league AGM on 17 June 2013 with the competition expected to start from the 2014–15 season at the earliest.

Sponsorship

From 1992 to 2006, the chartered accountants Lovewell Blake sponsored the league. Dolphin Autos took over sponsorship of the league from 2006 to 2010. Gleave & Associates sponsored the league for one year during 2010–11 season. This was followed by three seasons without sponsorship before the independent financial advisors, Almary Green, agreed to sponsor the league for three years from the 2014–15 to 2016-17 seasons.  Hadley and Ottaway are the current sponsors since 2017-18.

Format and regulations
No more than 80 clubs and 132 teams (first and reserve teams) are to be permitted to the league system. In theory this means that no more than 52 clubs can have both a first and reserve team competing in the league. No more than one team from a club can play in the same division. The Premier Division and Division One are "senior" divisions while the rest of the divisions are "junior" divisions.  There is a limit of 16 teams for each division. Some divisions are reduced in size either at the start of the season or during the season because of teams withdrawing, due to not enough players or financial problems. Their places for the next season are taken by teams elected from the feeder leagues.  Teams play each other twice, home and away, in a double round-robin format.

In Division One to Division Three, the top two clubs are promoted while the bottom two are relegated. In Division Four, the top two are promoted and the bottom 4 are relegated. In Division Five the top 2 are promoted from each regional division. In the Premier Division, there is no automatic promotion as clubs need to meet the FA's ground grading guide for admission to the Eastern Senior League in order to do so. Only teams finishing in the top two of the Premier Division are eligible for promotion (the runners-up are eligible if the champions decide not to apply for promotion). The bottom two clubs are relegated to Division One.  Clubs need to be elected from the feeder leagues below, in order for relegation to occur from the regional Division Fives, providing that there are no places in other divisions in the league to fill due to withdrawals.

There are some interesting rules in the Anglian Combination. Unlike professional leagues, no team or goalkeeper is allowed to wear black or very dark shirts. This is because referees' kits in this division are all black compared to professional leagues in which referees wear different coloured kits where appropriate. Another rule of interest is that matches can be less than 90 minutes but no less than 70 minutes, although this rule only comes into play if the two team captains and referee agree prior to kick-off and it is common sense for the match to be shorter than 90 minutes. A typical reason that this rule comes into play is for evening kick-offs due to a lack of natural light if the ground of the home team does not have floodlights. Similarly, half-time intervals can be less than 10–15 minutes with the consent of the referee.

FA Charter Standard

The Anglian Combination is looking to become a designated FA Charter Standard League. Member clubs had until the end of the 2014–15 season to become an FA Charter Standard club or they face expulsion from the league. New member clubs have one season to achieve Charter Standard status.

Transfers

Players are allowed to move clubs at any point during the season. However, each player is only permitted one move during the season. Once they move, they cannot move again until after the season's end.

Players

 Any team shall not have more than three players who have played in a more senior cup competition in two of the three consecutive games immediately prior to a league game.
 Players must be at least 16 years old to play an Anglian Combination game.

Premier Division ground grading

Clubs in the Premier Division are subject to the FA's Ground Grading regulations where they are subject to the regulations of Grade H. Clubs that fail to comply with the regulations by a certain deadline could face expulsion to Division 1 at the end of the season.  Every Premier Division club in the 2011–12 competition met the deadline of 31 March 2012 except North Walsham Town. They were given a deadline of 25 June 2012 to raise the funds and complete the work needed to meet regulations. Otherwise, North Walsham Town would have been demoted to Division 1. However, after finding the funds and getting the necessary upgrades done in time, they stayed in the Premier Division for the 2012–13 season, but were relegated at the end of the season.

Clubs for 2021–22 season

Premier Division (Sterry Cup)
Acle United | Beccles Town | Blofield United F.C. | Bradenham Wanderers | Caister FC | Dussindale & Hellesdon Rovers | Heacham | Long Stratton | Mattishall | Mundford | Norwich CEYMS | Scole United | Thorpe St Andrew | Waveney | Wroxham Reserves | Yelverton

Division One (East Anglian Division One Cup)
Attleborough Town | Aylsham | Brandon Town | Bungay Town | East Harling | Easton | Fakenham Town Reserves | Gorleston Reserves | Kirkley & Pakefield Reserves | Martham | Norwich United U21 | Sprowston Athletic | Stalham Town | Thetford Rovers | Watton United | Wells Town | [Croft City] |

Division Two (Allerton Cup)
AC Mill Lane | Beccles Caxton | Buxton | Caister Reserves | Castle Acre Swifts | Earsham | Gayton United | Holt United | Loddon United | North CEYMS Reserves | North Walsham Town | Reepham Town | Swaffham Town Reserves | Wymondham Town

Division Three (East Anglian Division Three Cup)
Attleborough Town Reserves | Aylsham Reserves | Beccles Town Reserves | Bradenham Wanderers Reserves | Costessey Sports | Dussindale & Hellesdon Rovers Reserves | Great Yarmouth Town Reserves | Hempnall | Horsford United | Long Stratton Reserves | Mattishall Reserves | Poringland Wanderers | South Walsham | Waveney Reserves

Division Four (George Hunt Cup)
Acle United Reserves | Belton | Celt Rangers | Dersingham Rovers | Harleston Town Reserves | Hemsby | Mulbarton Wanderers Reserves | Mundford Reserves | Mutford & Wrentham | Norton Athletic | Scole United Reserves | Thorpe St Andrews Reserves | University of East Anglia Reserves

Division Five North
AFC Lynn Napier | Briston | Cromer Youth OB | Dussindale & Hellesdon Rovers 'A' | Easton Reserves | Gayton United Reserves  | Holt United Reserves | Narborough | Necton | Norwich Eagles | Reepham Town Reserves | Stalham Town Reserves | Thorpe Village | Wells Town Reserves

Division Five South
AC Mill Lane Reserves | Blofield United Reserves | Bungay Town Reserves | Caister Development | Carlton Colville Town | East Harling Reserves | Freethorpe | Martham Reserves | Poringland Wanderers Reserves | Shrublands | Tacolneston | Thetford Rovers Reserves | Wymondham Town Reserves | Yelverton Reserves

Anglian Combination winners

1964–65
For the league's first "transitional" season, the members of the amalgamating leagues were split into three tiers, "Senior", "Junior" and "Reserves". Each of these three tiers was split into two parallel divisions, designated simply "A" and "B".

1965–2003
After the initial transitional season, the first teams in the league were split into four divisions, based on their finishing positions in the 1964–65 season. These became the Premier Division, Divisions 1, 2, and 3. Division 4 was added for the 1966–67 season. Reserve sides were similarly split into three divisions, Reserve Divisions 1, 2, and 3.

2003–2015
In 2003 the league was re-organised, reducing the number of divisions from eight to seven. The reserve divisions were included within the main structure of the league, allowing the reserve teams the possibility of promotion to the divisions containing other clubs' first teams.

2015–present
To try and tackle the issue of travel costs for players and clubs at lower levels of the league, the Anglian Combination's bottom two divisions were regionalised into Division 5 North and South for the 2015–16 season. This meant that Division 6 ceased to exist. Travel costs are one of a number of reasons why teams fold in the lower divisions of the league and it is hoped that the new system will help slow and maybe even reverse the negative trend. Generally, the A47 road from King's Lynn to Great Yarmouth is the cutoff point for determining whether clubs in Division 5 are placed in the North or South division

Premier Division league titles by club

Cup competitions
In addition to the league, clubs take part in the following cup competitions:

Don Frost Memorial Cup
Single match between the winners of the Senior League (Mummery) Cup and the winners of the Premier Division from the previous season.

Senior League Cup
Cup competition for all clubs in the Premier Division and Division 1. The two teams drawn together for each tie play one match with extra-time then penalties separating the sides.

Junior League Cup
Cup competition for any side competing in Divisions 2,3,4,5 and 6 plus the reserve sides of Eastern Counties League clubs competing in the Norfolk or Suffolk county cups. The two teams drawn together for each tie play one match with extra-time then penalties separating the sides.

Reserve League Cup
Cup competition for any of the reserve sides in Divisions 2,3,4,5 and 6.

Norfolk Senior Cup

Norfolk's premier cup competition with all teams from Norfolk that play in the Premier Division, Division 1 and any Norfolk sides that compete in the Eastern Counties League.

Norfolk Junior County Cup
Main cup competition for junior sides from Norfolk that compete in Divisions 2,3,4,5 and 6 of the league as well as sides from the lower leagues.

Suffolk Senior County Cup
Open to teams from Suffolk that play in the Premier Division and Division 1 as well as Suffolk teams playing in the Eastern Counties League.

Suffolk Junior County Cup
Cup competition for teams from Suffolk in Divisions 2,3,4,5 and 6 as well as reserve sides of clubs that are in the Eastern Counties League that are competing in the Suffolk Senior Cup.

References

External links
FA Fulltime
Online League Documents and Rules
Diss Express – local newspaper website covering several of the league's teams
 FA Full Time Anglian Combination League Tables and results

 
1964 establishments in England
Football leagues in England
Sports leagues established in 1964